Medmassa is a genus of corinnid sac spiders first described by Eugène Simon in 1887 under the name "Megaera", later renamed because "Megaera" was already in use as a synonym of the reptile genus Trimeresurus.

Species
 it contains ten species:
Medmassa celebensis (Deeleman-Reinhold, 1995) – Indonesia (Sulawesi)
Medmassa christae Raven, 2015 – Australia (Queensland)
Medmassa diplogale Deeleman-Reinhold, 2001 – Borneo
Medmassa frenata (Simon, 1877) (type) – Philippines
Medmassa insignis (Thorell, 1890) – Indonesia (Sumatra, Borneo)
Medmassa kltina (Barrion & Litsinger, 1995) – Philippines
Medmassa pulchra (Thorell, 1881) – New Guinea
Medmassa semiaurantiaca Simon, 1910 – Africa
Medmassa tigris (Deeleman-Reinhold, 1995) – Indonesia (Sumatra, Borneo)
Medmassa torta Jin, H. Zhang & F. Zhang, 2019 – China (Hainan)

References

Araneomorphae genera
Corinnidae
Spiders of Africa
Spiders of Asia
Spiders of Australia
Taxa named by Eugène Simon